Florent Besnard (born 30 April 1984 in Vannes) is a French professional footballer who plays as a midfielder in the Championnat National 3 for Saint-Colomban Locminé, and in May 2021 was appointed joint head coach of the club.

He played on the professional level in Ligue 2 for Nîmes Olympique.

References

1984 births
Living people
Sportspeople from Morbihan
French footballers
Association football midfielders
Ligue 2 players
Championnat National players
Championnat National 2 players
Championnat National 3 players
GSI Pontivy players
Vannes OC players
Nîmes Olympique players
AS Moulins players
Paris FC players
Saint-Pryvé Saint-Hilaire FC players
AS Vitré players
Saint-Colomban Sportive Locminé players
Footballers from Brittany